Zakka (from the Japanese 'kak-ka in de zak-ka'（雑貨）or 'many things') is a fashion and design phenomenon that has spread from Japan throughout Asia.

Zakka may also refer to:

Ignatius Zakka I Iwas (1933–2014), 122nd Syriac Orthodox Patriarch of Antioch and All the East and, as such, Supreme Head of the Universal Syriac Orthodox Church from 1980 to 2014
Henry Zakka (born 1956), Venezuelan actor and director
Nizar Zakka, a Lebanese information technology expert and advocate of Internet freedom

See also
Zaka (disambiguation)